Shorea platycarpa (called, along with some other species in the genus Shorea, light red meranti) is a species of plant in the family Dipterocarpaceae. It is found in Sumatra, Peninsular Malaysia and Singapore. It is threatened by habitat loss.

References

platycarpa
Trees of Malaya
Trees of Sumatra
Flora of Singapore
Trees of Peninsular Malaysia
Critically endangered flora of Asia
Taxonomy articles created by Polbot